Emanuele Beraudo, Conte di Pralormo (13 July 1887 – 11 October 1960) was an Italian horse rider who competed in the 1924 Summer Olympics. He was born and died in Pralormo, Torino, Italy. He also served as a general in the Royal Italian Army during World War II.

Biography
In 1924, Beraudo and his horse Mount Félix won the bronze medal in the team eventing competition after finishing 17th in the individual eventing.

He also participated in the individual jumping event with his horse Sido, but they were eliminated. The other three Italian riders finished fifth in the team jumping event.

References

External links 
 
 
 
 

1887 births
1960 deaths
Equestrians at the 1924 Summer Olympics
Italian event riders
Italian show jumping riders
Italian generals
Italian military personnel of World War I	
Italian military personnel of World War II
Olympic bronze medalists for Italy
Olympic equestrians of Italy
Italian male equestrians
Sportspeople from the Metropolitan City of Turin
Olympic medalists in equestrian
Medalists at the 1924 Summer Olympics
Recipients of the Gold Medal of Military Valor